Dash Shaw is an American comic book writer/artist and animator. He is the author of the graphic novels Cosplayers, Doctors, New School, and Bottomless Belly Button, published by Fantagraphics. Additionally, Shaw has written Love Eats Brains published by Odd God Press, GardenHead published by Meathaus, The Mother's Mouth published by Alternative Comics, and BodyWorld published by Pantheon Books.

Shaw's comic short stories have appeared in many different anthologies, newspapers and magazines. His square-sized short stories were collected in the 2005 book GoddessHead published by Hidden Agenda Press. His comics are known for their emphasis on emotional, lyrical logic and innovative design. He was named one of the top ten artists to check out at the 2002 "Small Press Expo" when he was 19 years old. He also writes lyrics and plays with James Blanca in the weirdo pop band Love Eats Brains! and has co-written and acted in various short film projects.

Shaw is the director of the animated features Cryptozoo and My Entire High School Sinking into the Sea

Early life
Shaw studied at the School of Visual Arts in Manhattan, graduating with a BFA in Illustration in 2005.

Career
Throughout college and since, Shaw has published sequential art short stories in a variety of publications in the United States and abroad, plus numerous magazine illustrations.

Shaw's Bottomless Belly Button was published by Fantagraphics in June 2008. His BodyWorld webcomic was bought by Pantheon Books and published in a single printed volume in April 2010.

Bottomless, an exhibition of Shaw's original drawings, storyboards, color background overlays and a new video animation, was on display at Duke University's John Hope Franklin Center from September 25 through October 31, 2008.

In the years following Bottomless Belly Button, Shaw published numerous short stories in comics form, and serialized the science-fiction story BodyWorld on dashshaw.com. It received an Eisner Award nomination for Best Digital Comic in 2009.

Late 2009 saw the release by Fantagraphics of The Unclothed Man In the 35th Century A.D., a collection of short stories that Shaw had previously published in MOME, along with several pages of storyboards and other ephemera from his animated shorts for IFC.

In 2010, Pantheon Books released the collected chapters of BodyWorld in the form of a graphic novel,

In 2013, releases from Shaw included the zine-style mini-comic New Jobs (Uncivilized Books), the comic-book length shorts collection 3 New Stories (Fantagraphics), and Shaw's next graphic novel, New School (Fantagraphics). New School takes place on an island preparing for an influx of English-speaking tourists upon the completion of a massive theme park depicting periods throughout history. It follows two brothers, one who has taken a job teaching English to island locals and another who has come to retrieve his sibling. In the course of the book, both of the brothers, but especially the youngest, experience alienation from their surroundings and conflicts with the locals. NPR called New School "striking and enigmatic," while Publishers Weekly described the book as "an unusual combination of bildungsroman, travelogue, and intellectual thriller."

Technique and materials
Shaw employs a combination of hand drawing, animation techniques and Photoshop to produce his artwork. Shaw started working on acetate sheets while studying at the School of Visual Arts. Pointing to pre-Photoshop comics that were colored via clear celluloid containing the black line art, under which would be placed a board with the painted colors, Shaw explains that he took this process and combined it with animation-style use of celluloid, where the backs of the acetate are painted with gouache and laid over a painted background, in addition to color separations where black line art is used to mark the different colors. In addition to using hand-drawing media such as crow quill pens, colored pencils, and markers, Shaw incorporates collage, Photoshop, and painting directly over photocopies, though he does not work with a separate line art layer, preferring to treat black as simply another color, and not a separate or more important element. On BodyWorld, for example, Shaw did the color separations by hand, used the paint bucket tool in Photoshop to color the shapes, and then printed it out and painted over the photocopy, before scanning it again and making final adjustments in Photoshop to achieve the final art.

Shaw explains that his key motive is combining what he likes about hand drawing with the processes available in Photoshop. He has stated that he does not own a drawing tablet, and that his actual knowledge of Photoshop is limited, compared to most mainstream colorists who rely on it exclusively, explaining, "that coloring leaves me cold."

Animation
His animation influences include Winsor McCay, Osamu Tezuka (in particular his work on Astroboy), and other 60s anime shows like Speed Racer, the 1973 cult films Belladonna of Sadness and Fantastic Planet, limited animation (including A Charlie Brown Christmas), Ralph Bakshi and Suzan Pitt.

Shaw's first animated feature film My Entire High School Sinking Into the Sea had its world premiere at the 2016 Toronto International Film Festival (TIFF) in September 2016 and was also shown at the New York Film Festival (NYFF). It features the voices of Jason Schwartzman, Lena Dunham, Reggie Watts, Maya Rudolph and Susan Sarandon.

He was also responsible for the "comic book" scenes in John Cameron Mitchell's 2010 film Rabbit Hole and the animated dream sequence on an episode of the controversial Netflix series 13 Reasons Why alongside Jane Samborski.

Cryptozoo 

His next feature Cryptozoo, about 1960s San Francisco zookeepers trying to capture a mysterious creature, was released in early 2021 at the Sundance Film Festival where it won the NEXT Innovator Award. It was also nominated for the John Cassavetes Award at the 37th Independent Spirit Awards.

See also 
Arthouse animation
Art horror
Alternative comics
Independent animation

References

External links
 
 Dash Shaw interview about his Sundance winner Cryptozoo
 Deadline article about Shaw signing with UTA

People from Hollywood, Los Angeles
School of Visual Arts alumni
Alternative cartoonists
Year of birth missing (living people)
Living people
Sundance Film Festival award winners
Collage artists
American animators
Collage filmmakers